Samuel Schachter (born May 8, 1990) is a Canadian Olympic beach volleyball player. In 2010 he won the FIVB World Junior (U-21) Championship with Garrett May. At the 2013 Maccabiah Games in Israel, he and Team Canada won a silver medal. He and partner Josh Binstock were 2014 Canadian national champions, and represented Canada at the 2015 Pan American Games and the 2016 Summer Olympics. At the 2018 Commonwealth Games, he and Binstock earned silver medals.

Early and personal life
Schachter was born in North York, Ontario, now lives in Richmond Hill, Ontario, and is Jewish. His parents are Jon and Doris Schachter, and he has an older brother Nathan.

He attended Westmount Collegiate Institute for high school. He earned his Bachelor of Arts in Communications Studies at Wilfrid Laurier University, competing for the Wilfrid Laurier Golden Hawks, with whom he was Ontario University Athletics Rookie of the Year. He has coached the Toronto Varsity Blues, George Brown College, and York University men's volleyball teams.

Volleyball career
In 2010 he won the FIVB World Junior (U-21) Championship with Garrett May.

At the 2013 Maccabiah Games in Israel, he and Team Canada won a silver medal in volleyball, losing the gold medal to the Israelis.

In 2014 he and his then-partner Josh Binstock were Canadian national champions. They also won a gold medal at the Parana Open, an FIVB (international volleyball federation) World Tour event. He was named the (U.S.) National Volleyball League (NVL) 2014 Best Defensive Player.

In 2015 they competed at the 2015 Pan American Games in Toronto, and finished 8th, after Schachter suffered a  back injury  prevented them from playing in the relegation round.  They finished 9th at the 2015 FIVB Volleyball Men's World Championship. In June of that year they also came in second at the Major Series tournament in Porec, Croatia, the first time a Canadian men's team had reached the podium in a major FIVB World Tour event since 1997. They competed in the 2015 FIVB World Championship, finishing ninth.

In May 2016, they finishing second at the FIVB Beach Volleyball Cincinnati Open.

Schachter competed along with Binstock at the 2016 Summer Olympics, where they came in 19th.

At the 2018 Commonwealth Games, he and Binstock earned silver medals.

References

External links
 

1990 births
Living people
20th-century Canadian people
21st-century Canadian people
Beach volleyball players at the 2022 Commonwealth Games
Beach volleyball players at the 2016 Summer Olympics
Beach volleyball players at the 2015 Pan American Games
Beach volleyball players at the 2018 Commonwealth Games
Canadian men's beach volleyball players
Commonwealth Games competitors for Canada
Academic staff of George Brown College
Sportspeople from North York
Sportspeople from Richmond Hill, Ontario
Olympic beach volleyball players of Canada
University of Toronto alumni
Jewish Canadian sportspeople
Pan American Games competitors for Canada
Commonwealth Games silver medallists for Canada
Maccabiah Games competitors by sport
Maccabiah Games silver medalists for Canada
Competitors at the 2013 Maccabiah Games
Academic staff of the University of Toronto
Volleyball players from Toronto
Wilfrid Laurier Golden Hawks players
Academic staff of York University
Medallists at the 2022 Commonwealth Games